Adele de Dombasle was a French traveller and illustrator. de Dombasle worked in the Pacific Islands during 19th Century.

References

French illustrators
19th-century Oceanian people
French women artists